Nepean—Carleton was a federal electoral district in Ontario, Canada that was represented in the House of Commons from 1979 to 1988, and again from 1997 to 2015.

It included the southern portion of the former city of Nepean and adjacent suburban and rural areas of west and southern Ottawa.

Geography
Nepean—Carleton consists of the part of the City of Ottawa lying east and south of a line drawn from the southwestern city limit, northeast along the southeast limit of the former Township of Goulbourn, northwest along McCordick Road and Eagleson Road to the southern limit of the former City of Kanata, then along the southern and eastern limits of Kanata, northwest along Eagleson Road, northeast along Highway 417, southwest along Richmond Road, east along the Canadian National Railway, southeast along Merivale Road, east along West Hunt Club Road, south along the Rideau River, east along the former southern limit of the City of Ottawa, south along Riverside Drive, southeast along Limebank Road, northeast along Leitrim Road, northwest along the Canadian Pacific Railway, northeast along Lester Road, northwest along Conroy Road, northeast along Hunt Club Road to Hawthorne Road and then in a straight line to Blake Road, and northeast along Blake Road, east along Highway 417, and southeast along Boundary Road to the eastern city limit.

History
The riding was created in 1976 from parts of Grenville—Carleton and Ottawa—Carleton. In 1987, it was abolished when it was redistributed between Nepean, Carleton—Gloucester and Lanark—Carleton ridings.

In 1996, it was re-created from parts of Nepean, Carleton—Gloucester, Lanark—Carleton and Ottawa South ridings.

It consisted initially of the townships of Goulbourn, Osgoode and Rideau, and the City of Nepean, excluding the northeastern part lying north and east of a line drawn from the western city limit east along the Queensway (Highway 417), southwest along Richmond Road, east along the Canadian National Railway, north along Merivale Road, and east along the northern boundary of the National Capital Commission buffer zone to the eastern city limit.

It was given its current boundaries described above in 2003.

The riding has been represented by Conservative Pierre Poilievre from 2004 until it was abolished due to the 2012 federal electoral boundaries redistribution, which saw the riding redistributed mostly into the ridings of Carleton and Nepean with small parts going to Orléans and Kanata—Carleton.

Members of Parliament
This riding has elected the following members of the House of Commons:

Election results

1997 – 2015

Note: Conservative vote is compared to the total of the Canadian Alliance vote and Progressive Conservative vote in 2000 election.

Note: Canadian Alliance vote is compared to the Reform vote in 1997 election.

1979 – 1988

References

Election results 1979-1984 from the Library of Parliament
Election results 1996-2008 from the Library of Parliament
 Election results 2011 from Elections Canada
 Campaign expense data from Elections Canada

Notes

Federal electoral districts of Ottawa
Former federal electoral districts of Ontario